Aston Rowant railway station was opened in 1872 and was a part of the Watlington and Princes Risborough Railway. Having closed in 1961, there have been proposals to reopen the station not only to the heritage services of the Chinnor and Princes Risborough Railway, but also National Rail commuter services operated by Chiltern Railways.

History
Operated from the outset by the Great Western Railway it stayed part of that company after the Grouping of 1923. The station passed on to the Western Region of British Railways on nationalisation in 1948, and was then closed by the British Transport Commission. The station was closed to passengers on 1 July 1957 and to goods in January 1961.

A single track ran through the station running through to pass under a bridge carrying the A40 main road between Oxford and London.

The station appeared in four films: The Captive Heart (1946), My Brother Jonathan (1947), My Brother's Keeper (1948) and Portrait of Clare (1950). Excerpts of these films can be found at The Watlington Branch Line YouTube Playlist.

Present day 
The station site is to be found just before the B4009 road meets the A40 road at the bottom of Beacon Hill near the M40 motorway. If approaching from the direction of Stokenchurch, the site is immediately to the right after passing the Icknield Way. The site is at a point where a bridge took the road over the line; this overbridge remains but is infilled to road level.

The actual station site is to be found near a path through a wooded area. An area where some remains may be covered is near the edge where the earth is piled high with little undergrowth. The area is now overgrown, yet a flat concrete surface is visible and the track bed is still apparent in undergrowth at the end of the flat area.

If explored, the overgrown area of the site reveals signs of the station's platform. The original railings of the platform are heavily bent and twisted from nature but are still in their original position. The goods platform too can still be clearly made out showing the brick construction. Bricks etc. can be found strewn around this area of the site and at the edges, where the original boundary fences remain.

Future 
There were reports in 1997 that the Chinnor and Princes Risborough Railway (CPRR) wished to extend its operations to Aston Rowant. A joint venture between the CPRR and Chiltern Railways was also proposed whereby the national rail operator would construct a new station at Aston Rowant to allow frequent weekday commuter services along the Icknield Line to connect with main line traffic through to London Marylebone, leaving the CPPR to run heritage services at other times. The scheme, which would cost around £3m, would seek to take advantage of Aston Rowant's location near junction 6 of the busy M40 motorway.

References

Sources

External links 
 Station on navigable 1946 O.S. map
 Photograph of Aston Rowant Station

Disused railway stations in Oxfordshire
Former Great Western Railway stations
Railway stations in Great Britain opened in 1872
Railway stations in Great Britain closed in 1957
1872 establishments in England
1957 disestablishments in England